Saundra Jacqueline Nneka Baron (born 20 July 1994) is an American-born Trinidadian footballer who plays as a goalkeeper. She has been a member of the Trinidad and Tobago women's national team.

Early life 
Baron served as captain of the Trinidad and Tobago under-17 national women's soccer team from 2008 to 2010. She started in goal during the 2010 FIFA Under-17 Women's World Cup. Baron was named first-team all-state, all-area her junior season.

College career 
In 2011, Baron started 16 of 17 gamed in goal at Coastal Carolina. She recorded 55 saves on 198 shots faced (.625), which also ranked ninth the single season annuals. She allowed 33 goals posting a 2.01 goals against average.

In spring 2013, Baron transferred from Coastal Carolina to Eastern Carolina University. Baron started in all 21 games that season with five shutouts and a 1.19 GAA. Baron made five or more saves in nine different matches that season.

International career
Baron made her senior debut for Trinidad and Tobago on 10 December 2015 in a 0–6 friendly loss against the United States.

References

1994 births
Living people
Citizens of Trinidad and Tobago through descent
Trinidad and Tobago women's footballers
Women's association football goalkeepers
Maccabi Kishronot Hadera F.C. players
Ligat Nashim players
Trinidad and Tobago women's international footballers
Competitors at the 2018 Central American and Caribbean Games
Trinidad and Tobago expatriate women's footballers
Trinidad and Tobago expatriate sportspeople in Israel
Expatriate women's footballers in Israel
Sportspeople from Rochester, New York
Soccer players from New York (state)
American women's soccer players
Sportspeople from Greensboro, North Carolina
Soccer players from North Carolina
Coastal Carolina Chanticleers women's soccer players
East Carolina Pirates women's soccer players
American expatriate women's soccer players
American expatriate sportspeople in Israel